A to B is a 4-track EP by American pop-rock singer-songwriter Matt Hires, released on August 17, 2010. The Ep includes the original album version of "Honey Let Me Sing You a Song" – first found on the Tampa-based tunesmith's acclaimed 2009 debut, "Take Us to the Start", it also features 2 new songs "A To B", "Rock N' Roll Heart" and a new recording of "Honey, Let Me Sing You a Song (Alternate Version)". The EP was released exclusively through digital service.

Background
The Ep was recorded during the State Lines Tour 2009–2010.

Concept

Song rework

Reception

Critical response
The EP has received positive review from music critics.

The Album Project "Matt Hires knows how to throw down a catchy tune and more new songs are always good. The new songs have a similar feel to his recent debut album, though this time it’s pretty much just Matt with an acoustic guitar going for it. I like the 2 new songs, but if you’re only looking to spend a buck, I’d spend it on "A to B"

"A To B is an EP that's fun as it is deep, and Hires manages to say a lot with just a few tracks. Isn't that the best way to do it though?" -Artist Direct

Track listing
A to B

References 

2010 EPs
Matt Hires albums
Atlantic Records EPs